Sentiocentrism, sentio-centrism, or sentientism is an ethical view that places sentient individuals (i.e., basically conscious beings) at the center of moral concern.  Both humans and other sentient individuals have rights and/or interests that must be considered.

Sentiocentrists consider discrimination between sentient beings of different species to be speciesism, an arbitrary discrimination. Coherent sentiocentrist belief respects all sentient beings. Many self-described humanists see themselves as "sentientists" where the term humanism contrasts with theism and does not describe the sole focus of humanist concerns. Sentiocentrism stands in opposition to the philosophy of anthropocentrism.

History 

The 18th-century utilitarian philosopher Jeremy Bentham was among the first to argue for sentiocentrism. He maintained that any individual who is capable of subjective experience should be considered a moral subject. Members of species who are able to experience pleasure and pain are thus included in the category. In his Introduction to the Principles of Morals and Legislation, Bentham made a comparison between slavery and sadism toward humans and non-human animals:

The late 19th- and early 20th-century American philosopher J. Howard Moore, in Better World Philosophy (1899), described every sentient being as existing in a constant state of struggle. He argued that what aids them in their struggle can be called good and what opposes them can be called bad. Moore believed that only sentient beings can make such moral judgements because they are the only parts of the universe which can experience pleasure and suffering. As a result, he argued that sentience and ethics are inseparable and therefore every sentient piece of the universe has an intrinsic ethical relationship to every other sentient part, but not the insentient parts. Moore used the term "zoocentricism" to describe the belief that universal consideration and care should be given to all sentient beings; he believed that this was too difficult for humans to comprehend in their current stage of development.

Other prominent philosophers discussing or defending sentiocentrism include Peter Singer, Tom Regan, and Mary Anne Warren.

Sentiocentrism is a term contained in the Encyclopedia of Animal Rights and Animal Welfare, edited by Marc Bekoff and Carron A. Meaney.

Concept 
Sentiocentrism believes that sentience is the necessary and sufficient condition in order to belong to the moral community. Other organisms, therefore, aside from humans are morally important in their own right. According to the concept, there are organisms that have some subjective experience, which include self-awareness, rationality as well as the capacity to experience pain and suffering.

There are sources that consider sentiocentrism as a modification of traditional ethic, which holds that moral concern must be extended to sentient animals.

Justification 
Peter Singer provides the following justification of sentiocentrism:

In line with the above, utilitarian philosophers such as Singer not only care about the wellbeing of humans, but also about the wellbeing of sentient non-human animals. Utilitarians reject speciesism, the discrimination of individuals on the basis of their species membership. Drawing an analogy between speciesism and other forms of arbitrary discrimination, Peter Singer writes that

Gradualism 

In the animal kingdom, there is a gradation in the nervous complexity taking examples from the marine sponges that lack neurons, intestinal worms with ~ 300 neurons or humans with ~ 86 billion. While the existence of neurons is not sufficient to demonstrate the existence of sentience in an animal, it is a necessary condition. Without neurons, there is no place where it can happen (and the fewer the neurons, the lower the maximum capacity for intelligence in an organism).

Gradualist sentiocentrism states that more complex interests deserve more consideration than less complex moral interests. One implication of this premise is that the best interests of a simple organism do not deserve consideration before the non-best interest in a complex organism (e.g., a dog with intestinal worms should be healed even though this results in the death of the parasites). Note that this does not lead to the rejection of interests of complex animals (such as pigs) versus the human desire to feed on them.

This is a vision that expands to areas that are not only relevant to other species, but to uniquely human issues, as is the case on the legalization of abortion. Gradualism poses a greater consideration of the mother against the fetus in question, given that the latter does not have the ability for complex interests in the early stages of gestation. An emblematic case in this debate is the evolutionary biologist Richard Dawkins, who says that "an early-stage human embryo, with no nervous system and presumably lacking pain and fear, might defensibly be afforded less moral protection than an adult pig, which is clearly well equipped to suffer".

As a fetus progresses they gain sentience until "the majority of neurons are already present in our brains by the time we are born". Since a 9-month fetus is nearing the mother's level of sentience, a sentiocentrist may, therefore, believe that greater rights should be afforded to a 9-month fetus than a 1-month fetus (if any). Late-term abortions should then require much greater justification under the law than a 6-week abortion, which may not require any justification under the law.

For example, "psycho-social" justifications are often viewed as valid reasons for aborting a fetus with little-to-no sentience, but it may take "medical necessity" to justify killing a fetus with a level of sentience approaching that of their mother.

See also 

 Anthropocentrism
 Biocentrism
 Ecocentrism
 Ethics of uncertain sentience
 Sentience
 Speciesism
 Technocentrism
 Theocentricism
 Veganism
 Wild animal suffering

References

Further reading 
 MacClellan, Joel P (2012) "Minding Nature: A Defense of a Sentiocentric Approach to Environmental Ethics" University of Tennessee.

Animal ethics
Animal rights
Normative ethics